Henri Gobbi ( or Henrik Aloiz Adalbert Gobby –  or Henri Gobbi-Ruggieri),  was a 19th-century Hungarian classical composer and piano professor. He was also a student and close friend of Franz Liszt. Many of Henri Gobbi's most important works still remain unpublished to date.

Gobbi had two children with Elisabeth Grimshaw. His daughter Gisela later became the second wife of Dr. Julius Adrian Pollacsek, while Franz Liszt took the sponsorship for his son Franz Xaver.

Life and career 
Gobbi was born on 7 June 1841, in Józsefváros, Pest, the son of Alois Gobbi-Ruggieri ( – ) and Mary Gobbi-Ruggieri (née Roth, or Rott). His father was also a very talented musician and violin professor in Budapest who had come from an aristocratic Italian-Paduan family. After his marriage to a Viennese woman Mária Rott (Roth), he settled in Hungary. His eldest son, Henri Gobbi showed in childhood an extraordinary musical talent, playing violin at the age of seven and later the piano.
 
At the age of 18 he had already become part of the then well-known trio Grünwald-Müller-Gobbi, where he played the piano part. He graduated from the Royal Conservatory, having studied with musicians János Nepomuk Dunkl and music theory and harmony classes with Károly Thern. But his financial problems did not disappear in the 1860s, so he still had to give private piano lessons at the beginning of his career in Budapest.
 
Liszt was at first careful as for Gobbi's compositions. Gobbi had sent him his first sonata in Hungarian style, Opus 13, which was dedicated to him, for Liszt's appreciation who expressed in his letter of reply an unusual interest and desire to meet the young artist himself. When Liszt recognized Gobbi's talent at their first meeting in Budapest, he gave his young pupil all of his attention. His works were acknowledged by other composers such as Johannes Brahms, Carl Tausig, Anton Rubinstein, and Hans von Bülow, whom Gobbi was in friendly relations with when he travelled to Vienna in the mid-1860s. Brahms made use of the revised version of his Piano Trio in B major, Opus 8. The other works were transcriptions that Gobbi did from Brahms and Liszt. The latter took Gobbi's sonata and several other compositions in his own concert program and let his students play them. 
 
On his return to Budapest he continued teaching and composing. At this point he wrote other musical works, a trio, a string quartet and various piano pieces. He showed the trio to Robert Volkmann, who then began teaching him composition. In 1866 Thern Károly resigned from his position as teacher at the National Academy of Music, opening vacancies for piano teacher candidates, but Henri's application was refused on the rounds of his young age.

Gobbi and Liszt's relationship began in 1867 when publisher László Kugler proposed to send to a few compositions to Liszt in Rome. Due to the extremely cordial relations with Franz Liszt, Gobbi became staff secretary and teacher when the Hungarian National Music Academy was built. His founder and president Franz Liszt, gave him the professorship of the piano department. He remained faithful to this institution for almost ten years as a leading exponent of contemporary music in Hungary. This decade was probably one of the most interesting periods in the history of this institution, as Franz Liszt's frequent presence in Budapest welcome enthusiastic music students from many countries. They rallied around the great composer and his rod professor. Henri Gobbi, who probably had the greatest respect among his disciples, among them the violin player and composer Edwin Bachmann, was known as a dutiful, strict but fair professor who enthusiastically supported and encouraged new talent and ideas. When Brahms was still terra incognito in Hungary, several of his works were presented by Henri Gobbi thus making the public aware of his name. He helped the Bach-culture to bloom in Hungary and breathed life into several pieces by Beethoven.
 
Liszt took Gobbi to his inner circles with little interruption for nearly 17 years, partly in Budapest, Rome and Weimar. Art enthusiasts wanted to know how Franz Liszt would interpret his works. That was also in the time when Henri Gobbi had the opportunity to live in New York City as professor, but he preferred to devote himself to his personal goal of an independent Hungarian musical culture. He died on 22 March 1920, in Budapest.

Selected works

Works for piano 

 Fantasy Pictures, Opus 17:
 Alone
 Begging child
 Intermezzo
 Near the monastery
 Outdoors
 Returning Home
 Six-tone Images
On the terrace
In the cemetery
The ruins of Csővár
With the big oak
In the chestnut forest
By the forest Bronnen
 Six small character pieces, Opus 19:
On the promenade 
Small soldier 
Night little piece 
With the fishing 
In the woods 
From old times
 An album sheet, Opus 27:
 Waltz Nr. 1, Opus 8
 Waltz Nr. 2, Opus 8
 Waltz Nr. 3, Opus 9
 Waltz Nr. 4, Opus 11
 Waltz Nr. 5, Opus 12
 Waltz Nr. 6, Opus 22
 Waltz Nr. 7, Opus 10
 Waltz Nr. 8, Opus 22
 Nocturne, Opus. 5
 Which is my star, Opus. 5
 Impromtu, Opus. 5 
 Kronázási induló-Ábránd, Opus 20
 Concert Studies No. 3, Opus 25
 Prelude and Toccatina, Opus 28
 First Grand Sonata, Opus 13

Four-handed piano works 
 Hungarian Suite No. 1
 Hungarian Suite No. 2
 Hungarian Suite No. 3
 Suite No. 4 Hungarian
 Hungarian Serenade
 Hungarian Sketches, Op 23
 Hungarian melodies
 Gyászra ébredés (sad awakening)

Works for violin and piano 
 Serenade No. 1 in F sharp minor, Opus 6
 Serenade No. 2 in F major, Opus 6
 Serenade No. 3 in D minor, Opus 6
 Serenade No. 4 in F sharp minor, Opus 6
 Serenade No. 5 in E flat major, Opus 6
 Serenade No. 6 in D Major, Opus 6
 My Friend A. Sipos, Opus 16, No. 1
 Miss Mary Stevens, Opus 16, No. 2
 My Friend F. Plotényi, Opus 16, No. 3
 My brother Alois, Opus 16, No. 4

See also 
 Classical music
 Romantic music

Notes

References 

 Attribution
 This article is based on the translation of the corresponding article of the German Wikipedia. A list of contributors can be found there at the History section.

Literature 
 Legánÿ Dezső, Franz Liszt in Hungary, 1869-1873, (LMo) - (Budapest Music Publisher) 1976.
 Kálmán Isoz; The Hungarian National Museum Library (Directory. VI. music manuscripts, I volume, Musical Letters) 1924

External links 
 

1841 births
1920 deaths
19th-century classical composers
19th-century Hungarian people
19th-century male musicians
20th-century classical composers
20th-century Hungarian male musicians
Hungarian classical composers
Hungarian male classical composers
Hungarian people of Austrian descent
Hungarian people of Italian descent
Hungarian Romantic composers
People from Pest, Hungary